Augusti Pagus was a Roman settlement in Roman Phoenicia. It was created in the 110s AD and lasted nearly seven centuries until the Arab invasion of the Levant. The settlement was named in honor of Roman Emperor Augustus, who ordered the development of this  in the central-northern hills of the Beqaa Valley.

History

In the 1st century AD, after the Roman conquest of Phoenicia, the Roman Emperor Augustus settled some veterans of his legions in what is now central Lebanon. 

Most of the Roman veterans settled in Berytus (The veterans of two Roman legions were established in the city of Berytus by emperor Augustus: the fifth Macedonian and the third Gallic), but a few moved to colonize the fertile Beqaa valley.

These few hundreds created the so-called "Augustus " or "Augusti ". 

The  was made of a group of farm-houses (owned by retired legionaries) in a relatively close and interconnected area.

From the 1st century BC the Beqaa valley served as a source of grain for the Roman provinces of the Levant and Rome; even today the valley makes up to 40 percent of Lebanon's arable land. Roman colonists created a "country district" within "Augusti Pagus", where are located the famous Roman Niha temples with Latin inscriptions. This district reached the Kadisha valley in north Lebanon: vestiges of Roman presence have been found in the "Asi Hauqqa cave" near Hawqaand the UNESCO World Heritage Site Cedars of God.

This  lasted some centuries until the Arab conquest of the region in the seventh century. Some villages still exist in the area: the most important are Niha and Hosn Niha, where remnants of four Roman temples still exist.

Notes

Bibliography

 Mann, J.C. The settlement of veterans in the Roman Empire London University. London, 1956

See also

 Roman Phoenicia
 Berytus
 Hosn Niha

Roman sites in Lebanon
Lebanon in the Roman era